The 1966 Cal State Hayward Pioneers football team represented California State College at Hayward—now known California State University, East Bay—as a member of the Far Western Conference (FWC) during the 1966 NCAA College Division football season. Led by first-year head coach Les Davis, Cal State Hayward compiled an overall record of 2–8 with a mark of 1–5 in conference play, tying for sixth place in the FWC. The team was outscored by its opponents 255 to 110 for the season. The Pioneers played home games at Pioneer Stadium in Hayward, California.

Schedule

References

Cal State Hayward
Cal State Hayward Pioneers football seasons
Cal State Hayward Pioneers football